Busta may refer to:
 Busta Rhymes (born 1972), American hip hop recording artist, actor, record producer and record executive
 Busta (surname)
 Busta Voe, a sea inlet on Mainland, Shetland Islands
 Mouth Moods an album with the track named Busta